The following lists sportspeople who have competed in Superstars competitions over the years by the competition they competed in.
Franco Harris

Britain

Female
Zoë Baker
Lesley McKenna
Shelley Rudman

Male
Alan Bates
Alain Baxter
Jonah Barrington
Robin Brew
Stan Bowles
John Conteh
Garry Cook
Tim Crooks
Lynn Davies
Keith Fielding
David Hemery
Brian Hooper
James Hunt
Brian Jacks
Kevin Keegan
Roger Kingdom
Du'aine Ladejo
Malcolm Macdonald
Wayne McCullough
Andy Ripley
John Sherwood
Stuart Matthews (surfer)

Canada
Brian Budd
Gaetan Boucher
Yvan Cournoyer
Tony Gabriel
Rod Gilbert
Bob Nystrom
Lanny McDonald
Travis Moore
Darryl Sittler

Europe
Kjell Isaksson
Brian Jacks
Jean-Claude Killy
Ties Kruize
Ingemar Stenmark
Ivo Van Damme

Ireland
Bernard Brogan
Eamonn Coghlan
Declan Burns
Gerry Loftus
Pat Spillane
David O'Leary

Sweden
Thomas Ahlsgard
Ingemar Stenmark
Mattias Sunneborn

United States

Female
Lynn Conkwright
Carla Dunlap
Linda Fernandez
Anne Henning
Nancy Lieberman
Ann Meyers
Mary Jo Peppler

Male
Johnny Bench
Jeremy Bloom
Bill Buckner
Ron Cey
Vince Coleman
Joe Frazier
Steve Garvey
Mark Gastineau
Willie Gault
Wayne Grimditch
Kelly Gruber
Elvin Hayes
Dave Johnson
Dave Kingman
Ron LeFlore
Hermann Maier
Bode Miller
Renaldo Nehemiah
Tom Petranoff
Mike Powell
Greg Pruitt
Peter Revson
Pete Rose
Kyle Rote, Jr.
Mike Schmidt
Bob Seagren
Jason Sehorn
O. J. Simpson
Tom Sneva
Jim Stefanich
Lynn Swann
Johnny Unitas
Herschel Walker
Charles White
Reggie White

External links
A list of athletes who have competed in the American, British and World events over the years

Superstars